Mesalia is a genus of sea snails, marine gastropod mollusks in the family Turritellidae.

Species

Species within the genus Mesalia include:

 Mesalia brevialis (Lamarck, 1822)
 Mesalia flammifera (Locard, 1896)
 Mesalia freytagi Maltzan, 1844
 Mesalia lactea (Möller, 1842)
 Mesalia melanoides Reeve, 1849
 Mesalia mesal (Deshayes, 1843)
 Mesalia opalina (Adams & Reeve, 1850)
 Mesalia varia (Kiener, 1843)
 † Mesalia alabamiensis De Gregorio, 1890
 † Mesalia bassiounii Abbass, 1967
 † Mesalia claibornensis
 † Mesalia clarki Dickerson, 1914
 † Mesalia concava Abbass, 1967
 † Mesalia ferialae Abbass, 1967
 † Mesalia gigantia Awad & Abed, 1967
 † Mesalia goshourensis Matsubara & Ugai, 2006
 † Mesalia lincolnensis Weaver, 1916
 † Mesalia martinezensis Gabb, 1869
 † Mesalia minuta Abbass, 1967
 † Mesalia multisulcata (Lamarck, 1804)
 † Mesalia pagoda Cox, 1930
 † Mesalia paleocenica Awad & Abed, 1967
 † Mesalia pedinogyra Oppenheim, 1906
 † Mesalia pumila Gabb, 1860
 † Mesalia rathbuni Maury, 1934
 † Mesalia shatai Abbass, 1967
 † Mesalia tricarinata Abbass, 1967
 † Mesalia vetusta Conrad, 1833
 † Mesalia virginiae Stilwell et al., 2004
 † Mesalia zitteli Awad & Abed, 1967

References

External links

Turritellidae
Taxa named by John Edward Gray